Mehrab Hossain can refer to:

 Mehrab Hossain (cricketer, born 1978), Bangladeshi cricketer
 Mehrab Hossain (cricketer, born 1987), Bangladeshi cricketer
 Mehrab Hossain (cricketer, born 1991), Bangladeshi cricketer